Philip Martin Christophers (December 21, 1871 – September 9, 1946) was a provincial politician from Alberta, Canada. He served as a member of the Legislative Assembly of Alberta from 1921 to 1930 sitting with the Dominion Labor caucus in opposition.

Political career
Christophers ran for a seat to the Alberta Legislature in the 1921 Alberta general election. He stood as a Dominion Labor candidate in the Rocky Mountain electoral district. The race was hotly contested, and Christophers defeated two other candidates to pick up the seat for his party.

Christophers ran for a second term in the 1926 Alberta general election. He rolled up a very large majority over two other candidates to hold his seat.

Chistophers retired from provincial politics at dissolution of the Assembly in 1930.

References

External links

Legislative Assembly of Alberta Members Listing

Dominion Labor Party (Alberta) MLAs
1946 deaths
1871 births
People from Lelant